The Cascadas de Agua Azul (Spanish for "Blue Water waterfall") are a series of waterfalls found on the Xanil River in the southern Mexican state of Chiapas. They are located in the Municipality of Tumbalá,  from Palenque, near Mexican Federal Highway 199.

These waterfalls consists of many cataracts following one after another, taken from near the top of the sequence of cascades. The larger cataracts may be as high as 6 meters (20 feet) or so. During much of the distance the water descends in two streams, with small islands in the middle.

The water has a high content of calcium carbonate and other minerals, and where it falls on rocks or fallen trees, it encases them in a thick shell-like coating of limestone.

The area was designated a flora and fauna protection area in 2000 by the Mexican government. The protected area covers 25.8 km2.

Local residents reportedly restored the waterfalls after the 2017 Chiapas earthquake has created a crack and led to a temporary reduction of the water flow over the falls.

Gallery

References

External links

Landforms of Chiapas
Waterfalls of Mexico
Tourism in Mexico
Tourist attractions in Chiapas
Tiered waterfalls
Flora and fauna protection areas of Mexico
Protected areas of Chiapas
Karst formations of Mexico
Petén–Veracruz moist forests
Chiapas Highlands